Tafourah - Grande Poste is a transfer station serving the Line 1 of the Algiers Metro.

Etymology
The Tafourah station - Grande Poste is located in El Khettabi Boulevard near the Grande Poste d'Alger.

The northern exits of the station provide access to the main post office on Boulevard Mohamed-Khemisti and the street Larbi Ben Me Hidi. The south exits giving access to the central power of the University of Algiers.

References

External links
 Algiers Metro Site
 Ligne 1 Algiers Metro on Structurae

Algiers Metro stations
Railway stations opened in 2011
Railway stations in Algeria opened in the 21st century